The Head of the Republic – Prime Minister of the Republic of Khakassia is the highest office within the Government of the Republic of Khakassia in Russia. The Head is elected by citizens of Russia residing in the republic. Term of service is five years.

List

Notes

References

External links
Russian republics

 
Khakassia
Politics of Khakassia